Parides proneus is a species of butterfly in the family Papilionidae. It is found in Brazil and Paraguay.

Description
Males and females:both wings with narrow white band, the red submarginal spots of the hindwing straight or slightly curved; anal spot not v-shaped. No discal spot proximalof the anal submarginal one. Width of central band and
the number of spots composing it on hindwing variable. A full description is provided by Rothschild, W. and Jordan, K. (1906).

Life cycle
The larva feeds on Aristolochia melastoma.

Taxonomy
Parides  phalaecus is a member of the ascanius species group
 ("Fringe-spots white. Hindwing with submarginal spots and usnally also discal spots or dots, or a discal band ; a quadrate whitish spot in space 2 of the forewing ;mostly with tail).A quadrate whitish spot in space 2 of the forewings is quite peculiar of the ascanius group

The members are
Parides agavus (Drury, 1782)
Parides alopius (Godman & Salvin, [1890]) 
Parides ascanius (Cramer, [1775]) 
Parides bunichus (Hübner, [1821])
Parides gundlachianus (C. & R. Felder, 1864) 
Parides montezuma (Westwood, 1842) 
Parides phalaecus (Hewitson, 1869)
Parides photinus (Doubleday, 1844) 
Parides proneus (Hübner, [1831])

Status
A common species and not known to be threatened.

References

Möhn, Edwin (2006). Schmetterlinge der Erde. Butterflies of the World Part XXVI (26), Papilionidae XIII. Parides. Edited by Erich Bauer and Thomas Frankenbach Keltern: Goecke & Evers; Canterbury: Hillside Books.  (Supplement 13 in English - by Racheli)

External links
Butterfly Corner Images from Naturhistorisches Museum Wien
Images of the type specimen

Butterflies described in 1831
Parides
Papilionidae of South America